The Sky Is Falling and I Want My Mommy is an album recorded by Jello Biafra with the Canadian punk band Nomeansno. The project came about after Nomeansno and Biafra had collaborated (on the song "Falling Space Junk (Hold the Anchovies)") for the soundtrack to the underground film Terminal City Ricochet. The title track is a new recording of "Falling Space Junk" with amended lyrics. Jello wrote the lyrics to "Bruce's Diary" from the perspective of his Ricochet character Bruce Coddle, but did so after the movie was released, so the song is only featured on this album.

Track listing
"The Sky Is Falling, and I Want My Mommy (Falling Space Junk)" – 3:15
"Jesus Was a Terrorist" – 2:34
"Bruce's Diary" – 5:19
"Bad" – 2:18
"Ride the Flume" – 2:38
"Chew" – 8:47
"Sharks in the Gene Pool" – 6:34
"The Myth Is Real – Let's Eat" – 5:45

Personnel
Performance Credits
Jello Biafra – vocals
John Wright – drums, backing vocals on "Sharks In The Gene Pool" and "Chew", horn arrangement on "Bruce's Diary"
Rob Wright – bass, guitar, backing vocals on "Sharks In The Gene Pool"
Andy Kerr – guitar, bass
Cecil English – backing vocals on "Chew"
Craig Bougie – backing vocals on "Sharks In The Gene Pool"
Mark Critchley – backing vocals on "Chew"
Blair Dobson – backing vocals on "Chew"
Lissa Beurge – backing vocals on "Sharks In The Gene Pool" and "Chew"
Pam Ireland – backing vocals on "Sharks In The Gene Pool"
The Totaliterrortones – horns on "Bruce's Diary"

Technical Credits
Jello Biafra – Producer
Cecil English – Engineer
George Horn – Mastering, Master Clearance
Mister Right – Producer
John Wright – Engineer
John Yates – Liner Design
Mark Critchley – Programming

References

1991 albums
Nomeansno albums
Alternative Tentacles albums
Collaborative albums
Jello Biafra albums